The Oriental scaly-toed gecko (Lepidodactylus orientalis) is a species of gecko. It is endemic to Papua New Guinea.

References

Lepidodactylus
Reptiles described in 1977